The 2015 season was the Hawthorn Football Club's 91st season in the Australian Football League and 114th overall. Hawthorn entered the season as the two-time defending AFL premiers, having won back-to-back AFL premierships. Hawthorn won their third consecutive AFL premiership, fifth AFL premiership, and thirteenth premiership overall, defeating West Coast 107–61 in the Grand Final. Hawthorn became the first team to win five premierships in the AFL era. Hawthorn became just the second team in the AFL era to win three-consecutive premierships; joining the Brisbane Lions (2001–2003); and the sixth team in VFL/AFL history to win three consecutive premierships; joining Carlton (1906–1908), Collingwood (1927–1930), and Melbourne (twice; 1939–1941, 1955–1957). Alastair Clarkson won his fourth premiership as coach, tying with Leigh Matthews for most premierships won in the AFL era. Clarkson also surpassed John Kennedy Sr. and Allan Jeans (3) for most premierships won as coach of Hawthorn. Luke Hodge joined Michael Voss as the only players to captain three premierships in the AFL era. Grant Birchall, Shaun Burgoyne, Luke Hodge, Jordan Lewis, Sam Mitchell, Cyril Rioli, and Jarryd Roughead all won their fourth premierships, tying with Martin Pike for the most in the AFL era. Shaun Burgoyne played in his sixth AFL Grand Final, tying with Martin Pike for the most appearances in the AFL era. As of 2022, this was the last time Hawthorn won a final.

Club summary
The 2015 AFL season was the 119th season of the VFL/AFL competition since its inception in 1897; having entered the competition in 1925, it was the 91st season contested by the Hawthorn Football Club. The Melbourne Cricket Ground once again acted as Hawthorn's primary home ground, hosting six of the club's eleven home games, with four games played at their secondary home ground, Aurora Stadium in Launceston, and one played at Etihad Stadium in Round 21. The four matches at Aurora Stadium were against the Western Bulldogs, Gold Coast Suns,  and the Brisbane Lions in rounds 3, 9, 15 and 22 respectively, while the one home game at Etihad Stadium was against  in Round 21.

Major sponsors Tasmania and iiNet continued as the club's two major sponsors, while Adidas continued to manufacture the club's on-and-off field apparel.

Senior Personnel
Alastair Clarkson continued as the club's head coach for the eleventh consecutive season, while Luke Hodge continued as the club's captain for the fifth consecutive season. Both have held their respective positions since 2005 and 2011, respectively.

Playing list changes
During the 2014 off-season, the Hawks acquired the services of 's James Frawley via the free agency system, as well as those of 's Jonathan O'Rourke during the trade period. 200-gamer Brad Sewell announced his retirement shortly after the end of the club's 2014 season, in which the club won their 12th premiership but for which he was overlooked. In addition, Mitch Hallahan, Kyle Cheney and Luke Lowden were all traded away from the club, while Jordan Kelly, Derick Wanganeen and Ben Ross were all delisted.

The following lists all player changes between the conclusion of the 2014 season and the beginning of the 2015 season.

Trades

Free Agency

Additions

Draft

AFL draft

Rookie draft

Retirements and delistings

2015 player squad

Season summary

Pre-season matches
The club played three practice matches as part of the 2015 NAB Challenge, and were played under modified pre-season rules, including nine-point goals.

Premiership Season

Home and away season

Ladder

Finals

Awards, Records & Milestones

Awards
2015 All-Australian team selection: Josh Gibson, Sam Mitchell, Cyril Rioli
Norm Smith Medallist: Cyril Rioli

Records
Round 1: Sam Mitchell kicked Hawthorn's 170,000th point in the VFL/AFL
Round 17: Hawthorn inflicted 's heaviest AFL defeat, winning by 138 points. The Hawks' score of 27.11 (173) was also the highest score posted during the AFL season.

Milestones
Round 1: James Frawley – first AFL game for Hawthorn (previously with )
Round 2:
James Sicily – AFL debut
Jonathan O'Rourke – first AFL game for Hawthorn (previously with )
Round 3:
Jarryd Roughead – 450th AFL goal
Round 7:
Grant Birchall – 200th AFL game
Round 8:
Ben Stratton – 100th AFL game
Round 9:
Luke Breust– 100th AFL game
Daniel Howe – AFL debut
Round 10:
Taylor Duryea – 50th AFL game
Alastair Clarkson – 150th win as head coach
Round 14:
Luke Breust – 200th AFL goal
Round 15:
Luke Hodge – 100th AFL game as Hawthorn captain
Paul Puopolo – 100th AFL game
Round 16:
Isaac Smith – 100th AFL game
Cyril Rioli – 200th AFL goal
Round 17:
Jack Gunston – 200th AFL goal
Round 18:
Alastair Clarkson – 250th AFL game as head coach
Round 19:
Cyril Rioli – 150th AFL game
Round 21:
Hawthorn's 1,900th game of VFL/AFL football.
Round 22:
Jack Gunston – 100th AFL game
Semi Final:
Matt Suckling – 100th AFL game
Preliminary Final:
Brian Lake – 250th AFL game

Brownlow Medal

Results

Brownlow Medal tally

 italics denotes ineligible player

Tribunal cases

References

Hawthorn Football Club Season, 2015
Hawthorn Football Club seasons